Jumpin' Punkins is an album by Cecil Taylor recorded for the Candid label in January 1961 but not issued in the States until 1987. The first release was in Japan by Victor in 1977 as Cecil Taylor All Stars Featuring Buell Neidlinger. The album features performances by Taylor with Archie Shepp, Buell Neidlinger and Denis Charles with Billy Higgins, Clark Terry, Roswell Rudd, Steve Lacy and Charles Davis added on one track.  Additional recordings from these sessions were released on New York City R&B in 1971 and Cell Walk for Celeste in 1988.

Reception

In a review for AllMusic, Scott Yanow wrote: "The two most intriguing performances are versions of Mercer Ellington's 'Jumpin' Punkins' and 'Things Ain't What They Used to Be' which feature the avant-garde pianist with trumpeter Clark Terry, trombonist Roswell Rudd, soprano saxophonist Steve Lacy, baritonist Charles Davis, tenor Archie Shepp, bassist Buell Neidlinger, and drummer Billy Higgins. Taylor's jarring comping behind the other soloists is quite interesting and somehow works. 'O.P.' and 'I Forgot' feature Taylor with Neidlinger, drummer Dennis Charles, and (on the latter song) the young Archie Shepp. A good sampler of Cecil Taylor's marathon Candid sessions."

Track listing
All compositions by Cecil Tayor except as indicated
 "Jumpin' Punkins" [Take 6] (Mercer Ellington) - 8:15  
 "O.P." [Take 1] (Buell Neidlinger) - 7:35  
 "I Forgot" [Take 1] (Cecil Taylor) - 8:34  
 "Things Ain't What They Used to Be" [Take 3] (Ellington, Ted Persons) - 8:55  
Recorded Nola's Penthouse Sound Studios, NYC, January 9 (track 4) & 10 (tracks 1-3), 1961

Personnel
Cecil Taylor - piano
Archie Shepp - tenor saxophone
Buell Neidlinger - bass
Denis Charles - drums (tracks 1, 2 & 4)
Billy Higgins - drums (track 3)
Clark Terry - trumpet (track 3)
Roswell Rudd - trombone (track 3)
Steve Lacy - soprano saxophone (track 3)
Charles Davis - baritone saxophone  (track 3)

References

1961 albums
Cecil Taylor albums
Candid Records albums